The women's 75 kilograms weightlifting event was the sixth women's event at the weightlifting competition, with competitors limited to a maximum of 75 kilograms of body mass. The whole competition took place on August 15 at 15:30. This event was the ninth Weightlifting event to conclude.

Each lifter performed in both the snatch and clean and jerk lifts, with the final score being the sum of the lifter's best result in each. The athlete received three attempts in each of the two lifts; the score for the lift was the heaviest weight successfully lifted.

Schedule
All times are China Standard Time (UTC+08:00)

Records

Results

 Cao Lei of China originally won the gold medal, but was disqualified after a re-analysis of her samples from Beijing 2008 tested positive for  GHRP-2 and GHRP-2 M2.
 Nadezhda Evstyukhina of Russia originally won the bronze medal, but was disqualified in 2016 after a re-analysis of her samples from Beijing 2008 tested positive  for dehydrochlormethyltestosterone (turinabol) and EPO.
 Iryna Kulesha of Belarus originally finished fourth, but was disqualified in 2016 after a re-analysis of her samples from Beijing 2008 tested positive for oral turinabol.
 Hripsime Khurshudyan of Armenia originally finished eleventh, but she was disqualified after a re-analysis of her samples from Beijing 2008 tested positive for stanozolol.

New records

References

 Page 2644

Weightlifting at the 2008 Summer Olympics
Women's events at the 2008 Summer Olympics
Olymp